Germigny-l’Exempt is a commune in the central French department of Cher.

Geography

Population

Sights
 The twelfth-century church of Notre-Dame, with its exceptionally tall tower-porch, was built after the siege of 1108 by Louis VI the Fat as a symbol of the Capetian « Pax Dei ». The inconographic program of its inner portal of 1215 is inherited from the north porch of the west portal of two churches: Laon Cathedral and the abbey church in Saint-Gilles du Gard. The tympanum showing a Sedes Sapientiae is meant to celebrate the triumph of the Church (the Virgin being symbolic of the Church) upon heretics who reject the real presence in the eucharist.
 The chateau of Château-Renaud, dating from the seventeenth century.

See also
Communes of the Cher department

References

Bibliography

External links

Photographs of the commune 
 

Communes of Cher (department)